Adopting Terror is a 2012 drama thriller television film directed by Micho Rutare and starring Sean Astin, Samaire Armstrong, and Monet Mazur. It was released on April 7, 2012. Parts of the movie were filmed in Los Angeles, Santa Clarita, and Sun Valley, California.

Premise
Tim and Cheryl are happy when they adopt a little girl named Mona. As they begin to form a family bond with each other, Mona's biological father (Kevin) stalks them. Kevin attempts to take Mona back but is stopped by Tim and Cheryl. As this stalking becomes repetitive, they call the police but they have no answer for them. They are then determined to protect Mona from the terror that Kevin brings to them.

Cast
 Sean Astin as Tim Broadbent
 Samaire Armstrong as Cheryl Broadbent
 Monet Mazur as Fay Hopkins
 Brendan Fehr as Kevin Anderson
 Michael Gross as Dr. Ziegler
 Siena Perez as Mona Anderson - Six-months-old
 Bella Mateko as Mona - Age one
 Gracie Mateko as Mona - Age one
 Shiloh Nelson as Mona - Age two
 Ken Colquitt as Judge Ryan

References

External links
 Official website at The Asylum
 
 

The Asylum films
American thriller drama films
2012 thriller drama films
2012 television films
2012 films
Films directed by Micho Rutare
American thriller television films
American drama television films
2010s English-language films
2010s American films